County Kerry was a constituency represented in the Irish House of Commons until its abolition on 1 January 1801. Following the Act of Union 1800 the county retained two seats.

Boundaries and boundary changes
This constituency was based in County Kerry.

History
In the Patriot Parliament of 1689 summoned by James II, Kerry was represented with two members.

Members of Parliament 
 1585–1586: John Fitzgerald and Thomas Spring
 1613–1615: Daniel O'Sullivan Beare and Stephen Rice of Ballyruddell
 1634–1635: John FitzGerald and Walter Crosbie and Sir Valentine Browne
 1639–1649: Sir Valentine Browne (died 1640 and replaced by Maurice Fitzgerald) and Sir Edward Denny
 1654: Sir Hardress Waller; Henry Ingoldsby (First Protectorate Parliament, Westminster)
 1656: Sir Hardress Waller; Henry Ingoldsby (Second Protectorate Parliament, Westminster)
 1659: Sir Hardress Waller; Henry Ingoldsby (Third Protectorate Parliament, Westminster)
 1661–1666: Captain John Blennerhassett, snr and Arthur Denny

1689–1801

References

Bibliography

 Johnston-Liik, E. M. (2002). History of the Irish Parliament, 1692–1800, Publisher: Ulster Historical Foundation (28 Feb 2002), and online History of the Irish Parliament Online – Ulster Historical Foundation
T. W. Moody, F. X. Martin, F. J. Byrne, A New History of Ireland 1534–1691, Oxford University Press, 1978

Constituencies of the Parliament of Ireland (pre-1801)
Historic constituencies in County Kerry
1800 disestablishments in Ireland
Constituencies disestablished in 1800